George E. Saddington (second ¼ 1905 – death unknown) was an English professional rugby league footballer who played in the 1930s.

Background
George Saddington's birth was registered in Sculcoates district, Hull, East Riding of Yorkshire, England.

International honours
George Saddington represented Rugby League XIII in 1934 against France, and won caps for England while at Hull Kingston Rovers in 1934 against Australia, and while at York in 1934 against France.

References

1905 births
England national rugby league team players
English rugby league players
Hull Kingston Rovers players
People from Sculcoates
Rugby league second-rows
Rugby League XIII players
Rugby league players from Kingston upon Hull
Year of death missing
York Wasps players